Marta Vadymivna Fiedina (born 1 February 2002) is a Ukrainian synchro swimmer. She is 2018 European Aquatics Championships champion.

At the 2020 Summer Olympics (postponed to 2021 because of the COVID-19 pandemic), Fiedina and her duet partner Anastasiya Savchuk won Ukraine's first-ever Olympic medal in artistic swimming, scoring a total of 189.4620 in the combined technical and free routines on 4 August. On 7 August, she was part of the Ukrainian team that finished third in the final with a total score of 190.3018, earning her a second bronze medal.

She won the silver medal in the solo technical routine at the 2022 World Aquatics Championships held in Budapest, Hungary.

References

External links

2002 births
Living people
Ukrainian synchronized swimmers
Sportspeople from Donetsk
World Aquatics Championships medalists in synchronised swimming
Artistic swimmers at the 2019 World Aquatics Championships
Artistic swimmers at the 2022 World Aquatics Championships
European Aquatics Championships medalists in synchronised swimming
Olympic synchronized swimmers of Ukraine
Synchronized swimmers at the 2020 Summer Olympics
Medalists at the 2020 Summer Olympics
Olympic bronze medalists for Ukraine
Olympic medalists in synchronized swimming
21st-century Ukrainian women